Rhene is a spider genus of the family Salticidae (jumping spiders).

Rhene may also refer to:
Rhene (island), Greek island in the Aegean Sea
Rhene (mythology), a nymph of Mount Cyllene in Greek mythology
Rhene (Diemel), a river of Hesse, Germany, tributary of the Diemel

See also
Rhen (disambiguation)